Muhammad Ali: His Life and Times is a biography of the boxer Muhammad Ali, written in 1991 by Thomas Hauser. It won the William Hill Sports Book of the Year award in that year.

Critical reception
Entertainment Weekly called the book "lovingly compiled and exhaustively researched," writing that "it's a solid, respectful, drably written piece of work-in other words, it suggests none of the spontaneity and brashness that attracted us to Ali in the first place." Kirkus Reviews called it "a detailed, if hagiographic, account of Ali's public career and private life."

A review of the book in the Chicago Tribune states:

References

1991 non-fiction books
American biographies
English-language books
Books about Muhammad Ali
William Hill Sports Book of the Year winning works
Biographies about African-American people